The 2018 Rugby Europe Under-18 Sevens Championship was held in Panevėžys, Lithuania from 5–6 May. France won the championship and qualified for the 2018 Summer Youth Olympics that would be held in Buenos Aires, Argentina. Ireland were runners-up.

Teams

Pool stages

Pool A

Pool B

Pool C

Pool D

Finals 
Cup Quarterfinals

Shield Semifinals

Challenge Trophy Quarterfinals

Ranking Playoffs

Final standings

References 

2018
2018 rugby sevens competitions
2018 in European sport